River Huang (born November 13, 1989) is a Taiwanese actor. He is the first actor signed by the director Yee Chin-yen. At age 18, Huang won the Best Actor award at the Golden Bell Awards for his debut role in Dangerous Mind, making him the youngest actor to win in that category. In 2009, he starred in Swedish-Taiwanese film Miss Kicki. And in 2010, he starred in Juliets, a Taiwanese film inspired by William Shakespeare's tragic love story Romeo and Juliet.

Filmography

Film

Television series

Music video

Discography

Soundtrack album

Awards and nominations

References

External links 

 
 
River Huang's blog
黃河、高慧君新科金鐘獎影帝影后 news in Wikinews Chinese Version
台灣的哈利波特 －《危險心靈》黃河側訪
新科帝后出爐 18歲黃河意外掄魁 高慧君走過最低潮謝家人

1989 births
Taiwanese male television actors
Taiwanese male film actors
Living people
People from Singapore
21st-century Taiwanese male actors